Ivar Feeding the Gulls is an outdoor 1988 bronze and aluminum sculpture by Richard Beyer, installed outside Ivar's Fish Bar by Pier 54, along Seattle's Waterfront in the U.S. state of Washington. The statue depicts Ivar Haglund, who founded the restaurant, feeding French fries to gulls. It was donated by a group of friends; their names are inscribed on the back of the chair.

References

External links

 Ivar Feeding the Gulls – Seattle, WA at Waymarking

1988 establishments in Washington (state)
1988 sculptures
Aluminum sculptures in Washington (state)
Sculptures of birds in the United States
Bronze sculptures in Washington (state)
Monuments and memorials in Seattle
Outdoor sculptures in Seattle
Sculptures of men in Washington (state)
Statues in Washington (state)